The 2016 JSM Challenger of Champaign–Urbana is a professional tennis tournament played on hard courts. It was the twenty-first edition of the tournament which was part of the 2016 ATP Challenger Tour. It took place in Champaign, Illinois, United States between November 14 and November 19, 2016.

Singles main-draw entrants

Seeds

 1 Rankings are as of November 7, 2016.

Other entrants
The following players received wildcards into the singles main draw:
  Christopher Eubanks
  Aron Hiltzik
  Jared Hiltzik
  Noe Khlif

The following player received entry as an alternate:
  Raymond Sarmiento

The following players received entry from the qualifying draw:
  Daniel Cox
  Marcos Giron
  Bradley Klahn
  Ryan Shane

Champions

Singles

 Henri Laaksonen def.  Ruben Bemelmans, 7–5, 6–3.

Doubles

 Austin Krajicek /  Tennys Sandgren def.  Luke Bambridge /  Liam Broady, 7–6(7–4), 7–6(7–2).

External links
Official Website

JSM Challenger of Champaign-Urbana
JSM Challenger of Champaign–Urbana
Champaign
2016 in sports in Illinois